CrossFTP is a free FTP, Amazon S3, Amazon Glacier, Google Storage, and Microsoft Azure storage client for Win, Mac, and Linux. CrossFTP adopts traditional FTP client GUI with local files displayed on the left, remote files on the right. CrossFTP Pro further includes SFTP, FTPS, and WebDav support, and features scheduling and directory synchronization.

Licensing
CrossFTP is free for personal, educational, non-profit, and business use.
CrossFTP Pro requires a license fee and provides more advanced features, such as data sync, multi-thread support, etc.

See also
 Comparison of FTP client software

Reviews and references
 Softpedia.com – Reviews – "It's a reliable app, the kind that extensively helps your work!" – By: Mihai Mircea, Editor, Software Reviews
 Dreamhost – Powerful FTP client
 PC Magazine – one of the Best Free Software of 2009 –  File Transfer/Download - CrossFTP

External links
 Official website

FTP clients
SSH File Transfer Protocol clients